

A total lunar eclipse occurred on December 8, 1573.

It was predicted and then observed by a young Tycho Brahe (assisted by his sister Sophia) at Knutstorp Castle. He said "I cannot but be very surprised that even at this youthful age of 26 years, I was able to get such accurate results."

See also 
 List of 16th-century lunar eclipses

References

External links
 Curriculum vitae of Tycho Brahe Tycho observes a lunar eclipse together with his 17-year-old sister Sophie. From the observation he finds the perigee of the Sun.
 Sophie Brahe, 1556-1643
 Brahe, Tycho, Complete Dictionary of Scientific Biography
 NASA graphics

1573-12
1573
1573 in science